was an eccentric, iconoclastic Japanese Zen Buddhist monk and poet. He had a great impact on the infusion of Japanese art and literature with Zen attitudes and ideals, as well as on Zen itself, including breaking Buddhist monastic teachings with his stance against celibacy.

Biography

Childhood
Ikkyū was born in 1394 in a small suburb of Kyoto. It is generally held that he was the son of Emperor Go-Komatsu and a low-ranking court noblewoman. His mother was forced to flee to Saga, where Ikkyū was raised by servants. At the age of five, Ikkyū was separated from his mother and placed in a Rinzai Zen temple in Kyoto called Ankoku-ji, as an acolyte. The temple masters taught Chinese culture and language as part of the curriculum, a method termed . He was given the name Shuken, and learned about Chinese poetry, art and literature.

Training
When Ikkyū turned thirteen he entered Kennin-ji in Kyoto to study Zen under a well known priest by the name of Botetsu. Here Ikkyū began to write poetry frequently that was non-traditional in form. He was openly critical of Kennin-ji's leadership in his poetry, disheartened with the social stratum and lack of  practice he saw around him. In 1410, at the age of sixteen, Ikkyū left Kennin-ji and entered the temple Mibu-dera, where an abbot named Seiso was in residence. He did not stay long, and soon found himself at Saikin-ji in the Lake Biwa region where he was the sole student of an abbot named Ken'o. It seemed Ikkyū had finally found a master that taught true  as Ikkyū saw it. In 1414, when Ikkyū was 21, Ken'o died. Ikkyū performed funeral rites and fasted for seven days. In despair Ikkyū tried to kill himself by drowning himself in Lake Biwa, but was talked out of it from the shore by a servant of his mother.

Ikkyū soon found a new teacher in a master named Kaso at Zenko-an, a branch temple of Daitoku-ji. Kaso was much like Ken'o in his style. For years he worked hard on assigned  and made dolls for a local merchant in Kyoto. Blows", which depicts Tozan becoming enlightened when Ummon rebukes him for wandering from one monastery to another. One day a band of blind singers performed at the temple and Ikkyū penetrated his  while engrossed in the music. In recognition of his understanding Kaso gave Shuken the Dharma name Ikkyū, which roughly means 'One Pause'. In 1420, Ikkyū was meditating in a boat on Lake Biwa when the sound of a crow sparked . Kaso confirmed this great enlightenment and granted Ikkyū . Ikkyū came up against the jealousy of Yoso, a more senior student who eventually came to run the monastery. In Ikkyū's poems, Yoso appears as a character unhealthily obsessed with material goods, who sold Zen to increase the prosperity of the temple.

Vagabond
Ikkyū could sometimes be a troublemaker. Known to drink in excess, he would often upset Kaso with his remarks and actions to guests. In response, Kaso gave  to Yoso and made him Dharma heir. Ikkyū quickly left the temple and lived many years as a vagabond. He was not alone, however, as he had a regular circle of notable artists and poets from that era. Around this time, he established a relationship with a blind singer, Mori, who became the love of his later life.

Ikkyū worked to live Zen outside of formal religious institutions. However, the Ōnin War had reduced Daitokuji to ashes, and Ikkyū was elected abbot late in life, a role he reluctantly took on. This firmly placed him in one of the most important Zen lineages. In 1481, Ikkyū died at the age of 87 from acute ague.

Legacy
Ikkyū is one of the most significant (and eccentric) figures in Zen history. In addition to passed down oral stories, this is due to the very popular animated TV series .

In Rinzai Zen tradition, he is both heretic and saint. He was among the few Zen priests who addressed the subject of sexuality from a religious context, and he stood out for arguing that enlightenment was deepened by partaking in love and sex, including lovers, prostitutes and monastic homosexuality. He believed that sex was part of the human nature, and therefore purer than hypocritical organizations and worldly pursuits. At the same time, he warned Zen against its own bureaucratic politicising.

Usually he is referred to as one of the main influences on the Fuke sect of Rinzai zen, as he is one of the most famous flute player mendicants of the medieval times of Japan. The piece "Murasaki Reibo" is attributed to him. He is credited as one of the great influences on the Japanese tea ceremony, and renowned as one of medieval Japan's greatest calligraphers and  artists.

Ikkyū wrote in -style classical Chinese, which was employed by many contemporary Japanese authors. For instance, the "Calling My Hand Mori's Hand" poem.

In popular culture

 Toei Animation produced the historical comedy anime series Ikkyū-san based on Ikkyū's recorded early life at Ankoku-ji Temple, originally airing on TV Asahi from October 15, 1975 to June 28, 1982.  The anime was directed by Kimio Yabuki and written by Makoto Tsuji, Tadaki Yamazaki, Hisao Okawa, Tatsuo Tamura, Hiroyasu Yamaura and Keisuke Fujikawa.  The series was received by all ages in Japan and throughout Asia. In 1976, there was also a theatrical film released as part of the Toei Manga Matsui film festival in the summer of that year.
 In the anime OVA Read or Die, a clone of Ikkyū appears as the leader of the villains, all of whom are also clones of famous historical figures.
 In the second edition of the book On the Warrior's Path, author Daniele Bolelli refers to Ikkyū as his "hero and philosophical role model". He also explored Ikkyū's life story in a chapter of his 50 Things You're Not Supposed to Know: Religion, and in two episodes of the podcast History on Fire.
 The Japanese manga author Hisashi Sakaguchi wrote a life story of Ikkyū, あっかんべェ一休, 'Ikkyu', or 'Akkanbe Ikkyu', more or less according to the popular stories about him.  The manga has been translated in four volumes into Catalan, Spanish, French, German and Italian.  In the manga Afterschool Charisma, a clone of Ikkyū appears among the main body of classmates in a special school filled with clones of famous historical figures.  Comic author Tom Robbins identifies Ikkyū as his "idol".  In the anime/manga Eyeshield 21, Hosakawa Ikkyū (細川一休) is the name of the genius cornerback on the Shinryuji Naga American football team.
 In the PSP game GA Geijutsuka Art Design Class Slapstick Wonderland, the children's story version of Ikkyū can be chosen as the picture book project theme/final story part of the game.
 Kleenex Girl Wonder wrote the song Don't Cry, Ikkyu about Ikkyū.
 In the Kamen Rider Ghost  DVD special, Ikkyu Eyecon Contention! Quick Wit Battle!!, the soul of Ikkyū helps Takeru Tenkuji/Kamen Rider Ghost to access his monk-like Ikkyū Damashii form.
 Wednesday Campanella's song and PV Ikkyu-san.

See also
Buddhism in Japan
List of Rinzai Buddhists
Puhua
Divine madness

Notes

References
 On the Warrior's Path, Daniele Bolelli, Blue Snake Books, 2008.
 The Possible Impossibles of Ikkyu the Wise, I.G. Reynolds, 1971, Macrae Smith Company, Philadelphia, Trade SBN: 8255-3012-1.
 Ikkyu and the Crazy Cloud Anthology, Sonja Arntzen, 1987, University of Tokyo Press, .
 Unraveling Zen's Red Thread: Ikkyu's Controversial Way, Dr. Jon Carter Covell and Abbot Sobin Yamada, 1980, HollyM International, Elizabeth, New Jersey, .
 Wild Ways: Zen Poems of Ikkyu, translated by John Stevens, published by Shambhala, Boston, 1995.
 Crow with No Mouth, versions by Stephen Berg, published by Copper Canyon Press, WA, 2000. .
 Steiner, Evgeny. Zen-Life: Ikkyu and Beyond. Cambridge Scholars Publishing, 2014. .

External links

 
Rinzai Buddhists
Zen Buddhist monks
1394 births
1481 deaths
Japanese tea masters
Japanese Zen Buddhists
15th-century Japanese poets
15th-century Japanese calligraphers
Sons of emperors
People from Kyoto Prefecture
People from Kyoto
Writers from Kyoto Prefecture
Writers from Kyoto